Zootopia, also known as Zootropolis or Zoomania in various regions,  is a Disney media franchise that originally started in 2016 with the release of the American animated feature film of the same name, produced by Walt Disney Animation Studios, and released by Walt Disney Pictures. The series takes place in the titular city where anthropomorphic mammals coexist, telling the story of an unlikely partnership between a rabbit police officer and a red fox con artist as they uncover a criminal conspiracy.

The franchise consists of two CGI-animated films, Zootopia  (2016) and a sequel currently in development, and one television series, Zootopia+ (2022), which aired on Disney+.

Overview

Zootopia (2016)

In a world populated by anthropomorphic mammals, Judy Hopps, a rabbit from a rural town called Bunnyburrow, fulfils her childhood dream of becoming a police officer in the urban city of Zootopia. Despite being the academy valedictorian, Judy is assigned to parking duty by Chief Bogo, who fails to recognize her talent. 

On her first day on the job, Judy is hustled by a con artist fox duo, Nick Wilde and Finnick. The next day, a small-time crook and bootleg film seller named Duke Weaselton steals a bag of crocus bulbs known as Midnicampum holicithias. Judy abandons her post to arrest Weaselton, and is reprimanded by Bogo. Mrs. Otterton unexpectedly barges into Bogo's office, pleading for someone to find her husband Emmitt, one of fourteen missing mammals. Judy volunteers and the city's assistant mayor, a sheep named Dawn Bellwether, praises the assignment. Bogo has no choice but to agree, but secretly orders Judy to resign if she fails after forty-eight hours.

Having ascertained that Nick was the last to see Emmitt, Judy forces him into helping her by covertly recording his confession to tax evasion on her carrot pen. They track Emmitt's belongings to a limousine owned by crime boss Mr. Big, an arctic shrew whom Nick has a history with. He reveals that Emmitt suddenly went "savage" and attacked Mr. Big's chauffeur Manchas, a black jaguar. 

Upon interrogation, Manchas explains that prior to attacking him, Emmitt yelled about "Night Howlers", before then turning savage himself and chasing the pair. Judy traps Manchas and calls the ZPD for help; however, Manchas vanishes before they arrive. Bogo demands Judy's resignation, but Nick reminds Bogo that she still has ten hours remaining. While leaving the scene, Nick reveals to Judy that he became a con artist because, as a child, he tried to join the Junior Ranger Scouts, but was bullied and rejected simply for being a fox.

At City Hall, Bellwether offers Judy and Nick access to Zootopia's traffic cameras. They discover Manchas was taken by timberwolves, whom Judy surmises are the "Night Howlers". Following the wolves, the duo locates Emmitt, Manchas, and the other missing animals, who are now all "savage" predators, imprisoned at a local asylum. Zootopia's mayor, Leodore Lionheart, ordered their capture and is trying to ascertain the cause of their feral behavior. Lionheart and the asylum staff are soon arrested for false imprisonment, and Bellwether becomes the new mayor. 

Judy, praised for solving the case, asks Nick to join the ZPD as her partner. However, he angrily rejects her offer and abandons her after Judy claims that predatory biology is behind the mysterious "savageness" epidemic. Judy's comments, broadcast on television, incite fear and discrimination against predators throughout Zootopia.

Wracked with guilt, Judy quits her job and returns to Bunny Burrow to manage her parent's vegetable stand. There, she learns that "Night Howlers" are actually flowers with severe, lasting psychotropic effects that cause mammals to return to a feral state. Realizing they are the reason predators are becoming savages, Judy returns to Zootopia and reconciles with Nick. Aided by Mr. Big, the pair interrogate Weaselton, who admits he was hired by a ram named Doug to steal the Night Howler bulbs. They find Doug in a laboratory hidden in the city subway, where he manufactures a Night Howler serum to be shot at predators via a dart pistol. Judy and Nick obtain a serum gun as evidence, but before they can reach the ZPD, Bellwether confronts them in the Natural History Museum, revealing herself to have masterminded a prey-supremacist conspiracy. The duo become trapped in an exhibit and Bellwether attempts to infect Nick by shooting him with the pistol before summoning the ZPD, but shockingly discovers that Nick had replaced the ammunition with blueberries. Judy reveals she recorded Bellwether's confession with the carrot pen, after which the ZPD arrives.

Bellwether and her accomplices are arrested. The still-imprisoned Lionheart publicly denies knowledge of her plot and claims that imprisoning the infected predators was a "wrong thing for the right reason". With the cause of the epidemic identified, the predators are cured and Judy is reinstated into the ZPD. Months later, Nick graduates from the police academy, becoming her partner and the first fox police officer.

Films

Zootopia (2016)

The 55th Disney animated feature film. Development of the film that would come to be called Zootopia began when Byron Howard pitched six-story ideas to Disney Animation chief creative officer and executive producer John Lasseter, of which three involved animal characters: an all-animal adaptation of The Three Musketeers, a 1960s-themed story about a "mad doctor cat...who turned children into animals", and a "bounty hunter pug in space". The common thread running through these ideas was that Howard wanted to do a film similar to Disney's Robin Hood, which also featured animals in anthropomorphic roles. According to Howard, Zootopia emerged from his desire to create something different from other animal anthropomorphic films, where animals either live in the natural world or in the human world. His concept, in which animals live in a modern world designed by animals for animals, was well received by Lasseter, who responded by embracing and lifting Howard "in the air like a baby Simba". Lasseter suggested that Howard should try combining the 1960s theme with the animal characters, especially the space pug. This led Howard to develop and pitch Savage Seas, an international spy film centered on an arctic hare named "Jack Savage" who was somewhat like James Bond. It was around this time that screenwriter Jared Bush was hired to work on the film; he was excited to work on a spy film because his own father and grandfather had worked for the Central Intelligence Agency.

Howard and Bush continued to develop the film with the assistance of the Disney Story Trust, the studio's top creative personnel who meet regularly to review and discuss all projects in development. The most delightful part of the spy film turned out to be its first act, set in a city created by and for animals. To focus on the all-animal city, Howard eventually dropped the 1960s setting, along with the espionage and international aspects, and changed the film into a contemporary police procedural in which Nick Wilde was the lead role and Judy Hopps was essentially his sidekick. For a while, "the filmmakers were very committed" to that version of the story, but then in November 2014, the filmmakers realized the film's plot would be more engaging if they reversed the roles to instead focus on Hopps as opposed to Wilde. The change in perspective involved dropping several characters, including two characters known as "The Gerbil Jerks" who were described as "trust-fund gerbils that had nothing better to do than harass Nick."

In May 2013, The Hollywood Reporter initially reported that Howard was directing the film and that Jason Bateman had been cast, but little else about the film was known at the time. Zootopia was first officially announced on August 10, 2013, at the D23 Expo, with a March 2016 release date.

Research for the film took place in Disney's Animal Kingdom, as well as in Kenya and the San Diego Zoo Safari Park, where animators spent eight months studying various animals' walk cycles as well as fur color. Eight hundred thousand forms of mammals were created for and featured in the film. To make the characters' fur even more realistic, they also went to the Natural History Museum of Los Angeles County to closely observe the appearance of fur with a microscope under a variety of lighting. The filmmakers drew inspiration for Zootopias urban design from major cities including New York City, San Francisco, Las Vegas, Paris, Shanghai, Hong Kong, and Brasília. For assistance with designing motor vehicles appropriate for so many different types and sizes of mammals, the filmmakers consulted with J Mays, former chief creative officer of the Ford Motor Company. During the development process, Walt Disney Studios chairman Alan F. Horn suggested that Nick should expressly state his disappointment ("Just when I thought someone actually believed in me...") after discovering that Judy still fears him as a predator. In March 2015, it was revealed that Rich Moore (Wreck-It Ralph) had been added as a director of the film, in addition to Jared Bush (Penn Zero: Part-Time Hero) as co-director.

Untitled Zootopia sequel (TBA)
In June 2016, Howard and Moore were in talks about the possibility of a Zootopia sequel. On February 8, 2023, Disney CEO Bob Iger announced that a sequel to Zootopia was in the works.

Television specials and series

Zootopia+ (2022)

The anthology series features six stories that take place during the events of the original film. On December 10, 2020, Walt Disney Animation Studios chief creative officer Jennifer Lee announced that a spin-off series titled Zootopia+ and based on the 2016 film Zootopia is in development at the studio for Disney+. Trent Correy and Josie Trinidad, who worked as an animator and head of story for the film, respectively, were set to direct the series. The idea for the series was suggested by Correy during a pitch presentation in 2020, as one of three pitches for potential Disney+ series; he developed a pitch for a Zootopia series due to his interest in wanting to further explore the film's world and characters. Trinidad was originally set to direct only two episodes for the series, but her excitement to work on the project caused her to be ascended to co-director for the entire series alongside Cortney. The series was produced remotely due to the COVID-19 pandemic, which complicated the production process according to producer Nathan Curtis. Correy's pitch featured 10 stories, but four of them had to be discarded due to receiving a 6-episode order. Lee executive-produces the series alongside Zootopia co-directors and Encanto directors Byron Howard and Jared Bush.

Cast and characters

Additional crew

Reception

Box office performance

Critical and public reception

Reviews

Awards

The film was chosen by the American Film Institute as one of the top ten films of 2016, and won the Academy Award, Golden Globe, Critics Choice Movie Award and Annie Award for Best Animated Feature Film. It also received a nomination for the BAFTA Award for Best Animated Film, which it lost to Kubo and the Two Strings.

Video Games
Disney Infinity 3.0
Disney Magic Kingdoms
Disney Dreamlight Valley
Disney Heroes: Battle Modes
Zootopia: Crimes Files
Zootopia Racing Carnival

Attraction
Zootopia theme-land will open at Walt Disney World and Shanghai Disneyland.

Notes

References

External Links
 
 
 
 
 
 
 
 Official screenplay

Film series introduced in 2016
English-language films
Animated film series
Walt Disney Studios (division) franchises
Comedy film franchises
Children's film series
American children's animated adventure films
American buddy cop films
Animated buddy films
Animated films about mammals